The Italian general election of 2008 took place on 13–14 April 2008.

The election was won in Veneto by the centre-right coalition between The People of Freedom and Lega Nord, as it happened at the national level. The People of Freedom was the largest party in the election with 27.4%, slightly ahead of Lega Nord (27.1%) and the Democratic Party (26.5%).

Results

Chamber of Deputies

|-
|- bgcolor="#E9E9E9"
!rowspan="1" align="left" valign="top"|Coalition leader
!rowspan="1" align="center" valign="top"|votes
!rowspan="1" align="center" valign="top"|votes (%)
!rowspan="1" align="center" valign="top"|seats
!rowspan="1" align="left" valign="top"|Party
!rowspan="1" align="center" valign="top"|votes
!rowspan="1" align="center" valign="top"|votes (%)
!rowspan="1" align="center" valign="top"|seats
|-
!rowspan="2" align="left" valign="top"|Silvio Berlusconi
|rowspan="2" valign="top"|1,669,234
|rowspan="2" valign="top"|54.5
|rowspan="2" valign="top"|31

|align="left"|The People of Freedom
|valign="top"|838,640
|valign="top"|27.4
|valign="top"|15
|-
|align="left"|Lega Nord
|valign="top"|830,594
|valign="top"|27.1
|valign="top"|16

|-
!rowspan="2" align="left" valign="top"|Walter Veltroni
|rowspan="2" valign="top"|944,380
|rowspan="2" valign="top"|30.8
|rowspan="2" valign="top"|16

|align="left"|Democratic Party
|valign="top"|812,506
|valign="top"|26.5
|valign="top"|14
|-
|align="left"|Italy of Values
|valign="top"|131,874
|valign="top"|4.3
|valign="top"|2

|-
!rowspan="1" align="left" valign="top"|Pier Ferdinando Casini
|rowspan="1" valign="top"|171,126
|rowspan="1" valign="top"|5.6
|rowspan="1" valign="top"|3

|align="left"|Union of the Centre
|valign="top"|171,126
|valign="top"|5.6
|valign="top"|3

|-
!rowspan="1" align="left" valign="top"|Fausto Bertinotti
|rowspan="1" valign="top"|68,159
|rowspan="1" valign="top"|2.2
|rowspan="1" valign="top"|-

|align="left"|The Left – The Rainbow
|valign="top"|68,159
|valign="top"|2.2
|valign="top"|-

|-
!rowspan="1" align="left" valign="top"|Daniela Santanché
|rowspan="1" valign="top"|59,925
|rowspan="1" valign="top"|2.0
|rowspan="1" valign="top"|-

|align="left"|The Right
|valign="top"|59,925
|valign="top"|2.0
|valign="top"|-

|-
!rowspan="1" align="left" valign="top"|Giorgio Vido
|rowspan="1" valign="top"|31,353
|rowspan="1" valign="top"|1.0
|rowspan="1" valign="top"|-

|align="left"|Liga Veneta Repubblica
|valign="top"|31,353
|valign="top"|1.0
|valign="top"|-

|-
!rowspan="1" align="left" valign="top"|Renzo Rabellino
|rowspan="1" valign="top"|22,502
|rowspan="1" valign="top"|0.7
|rowspan="1" valign="top"|-

|align="left"|List of Speaking Crickets
|valign="top"|22,502
|valign="top"|0.7
|valign="top"|-

|-
!rowspan="1" align="left" valign="top"|Enrico Boselli
|rowspan="1" valign="top"|16,547
|rowspan="1" valign="top"|0.5
|rowspan="1" valign="top"|-

|align="left"|Socialist Party
|valign="top"|16,547
|valign="top"|0.5
|valign="top"|-

|-
!rowspan="1" align="left" valign="top"|Giuliano Ferrara
|rowspan="1" valign="top"|16,308
|rowspan="1" valign="top"|0.5
|rowspan="1" valign="top"|-

|align="left"|Abortion? No, thanks
|valign="top"|16,308
|valign="top"|0.5
|valign="top"|-

|-
!rowspan="1" align="left" valign="top"|Others
|rowspan="1" valign="top"|66,504
|rowspan="1" valign="top"|2.2
|rowspan="1" valign="top"|-

|align="left"|Others
|valign="top"|66,504
|valign="top"|2.2
|valign="top"|-

|-
|- bgcolor="#E9E9E9"
!rowspan="1" align="left" valign="top"|Total coalitions
!rowspan="1" align="right" valign="top"|3,066,038
!rowspan="1" align="right" valign="top"|100.0
!rowspan="1" align="right" valign="top"|50
!rowspan="1" align="left" valign="top"|Total parties
!rowspan="1" align="right" valign="top"|3,066,038
!rowspan="1" align="right" valign="top"|100.0
!rowspan="1" align="right" valign="top"|50
|}
Source: Regional Council of Veneto

Senate

|-
|- bgcolor="#E9E9E9"
!rowspan="1" align="left" valign="top"|Coalition leader
!rowspan="1" align="center" valign="top"|votes
!rowspan="1" align="center" valign="top"|votes (%)
!rowspan="1" align="center" valign="top"|seats
!rowspan="1" align="left" valign="top"|Party
!rowspan="1" align="center" valign="top"|votes
!rowspan="1" align="center" valign="top"|votes (%)
!rowspan="1" align="center" valign="top"|seats
|-
!rowspan="2" align="left" valign="top"|Silvio Berlusconi
|rowspan="2" valign="top"|1,540,993
|rowspan="2" valign="top"|54.4
|rowspan="2" valign="top"|15

|align="left"|The People of Freedom
|valign="top"|802,533
|valign="top"|28.3
|valign="top"|8
|-
|align="left"|Lega Nord
|valign="top"|738,460
|valign="top"|26.1
|valign="top"|7

|-
!rowspan="2" align="left" valign="top"|Walter Veltroni
|rowspan="2" valign="top"|895,433
|rowspan="2" valign="top"|31.6
|rowspan="2" valign="top"|9

|align="left"|Democratic Party
|valign="top"|771,974
|valign="top"|27.2
|valign="top"|8
|-
|align="left"|Italy of Values
|valign="top"|123,459
|valign="top"|4.4
|valign="top"|1

|-
!rowspan="1" align="left" valign="top"|Pier Ferdinando Casini
|rowspan="1" valign="top"|162,719
|rowspan="1" valign="top"|5.7
|rowspan="1" valign="top"|-

|align="left"|Union of the Centre
|valign="top"|162,719
|valign="top"|5.7
|valign="top"|-

|-
!rowspan="1" align="left" valign="top"|Fausto Bertinotti
|rowspan="1" valign="top"|61,279
|rowspan="1" valign="top"|2.2
|rowspan="1" valign="top"|-

|align="left"|The Left – The Rainbow
|valign="top"|61,279
|valign="top"|2.2
|valign="top"|-

|-
!rowspan="1" align="left" valign="top"|Daniela Santanché
|rowspan="1" valign="top"|49,101
|rowspan="1" valign="top"|1.7
|rowspan="1" valign="top"|-

|align="left"|The Right
|valign="top"|49,101
|valign="top"|1.7
|valign="top"|-

|-
!rowspan="1" align="left" valign="top"|Giorgio Vido
|rowspan="1" valign="top"|46,677
|rowspan="1" valign="top"|1.7
|rowspan="1" valign="top"|-

|align="left"|Liga Veneta Repubblica
|valign="top"|46,677
|valign="top"|1.7
|valign="top"|-

|-
!rowspan="1" align="left" valign="top"|Enrico Boselli
|rowspan="1" valign="top"|14,756
|rowspan="1" valign="top"|0.5
|rowspan="1" valign="top"|-

|align="left"|Socialist Party
|valign="top"|14,756
|valign="top"|0.5
|valign="top"|-

|-
!rowspan="1" align="left" valign="top"|Others
|rowspan="1" valign="top"|62,123
|rowspan="1" valign="top"|2.2
|rowspan="1" valign="top"|-

|align="left"|Others
|valign="top"|62,123
|valign="top"|2.2
|valign="top"|-

|-
|- bgcolor="#E9E9E9"
!rowspan="1" align="left" valign="top"|Total coalitions
!rowspan="1" align="right" valign="top"|2,834,078
!rowspan="1" align="right" valign="top"|100.0
!rowspan="1" align="right" valign="top"|24
!rowspan="1" align="left" valign="top"|Total parties
!rowspan="1" align="right" valign="top"|2,834,078
!rowspan="1" align="right" valign="top"|100.0
!rowspan="1" align="right" valign="top"|24
|}Source: Regional Council of Veneto

MPs elected in Veneto

Chamber of Deputies

Veneto 1 (Verona-Vicenza-Padova-Rovigo)

Lega Nord
Stefano Stefani
Matteo Bragantini
Manuela Dal Lago
Francesca Martini
Massimo Bitonci
Paola Goisis
Alessandro Montagnoli
Manuela Lanzarin
Emanuela Munerato
Giovanna Negro

The People of Freedom
Niccolò Ghedini
Alberto Giorgetti
Aldo Brancher
Francesco De Luca
Filippo Ascierto
Marino Zorzato (replaced by Giorgio Conte on 10 June 2010)
Lorena Milanato
Luca Bellotti
Giustina Destro

Democratic Party
Massimo Calearo
Alessandro Naccarato
Margherita Miotto
Federica Mogherini
Giampaolo Fogliardi
Gian Pietro Dal Moro
Federico Testa
Daniela Sbrollini

Union of the Centre
Roberto Rao
Antonio De Poli

Italy of Values
Antonio Borghesi

Veneto 2 (Venezia-Treviso-Belluno)

Lega Nord
Gianpaolo Dozzo
Guido Dussin
Corrado Callegari
Luciano Dussin (replaced by Sabina Fabi on 15 December 2011)
Franco Gidoni
Gianluca Forcolin

The People of Freedom
Renato Brunetta
Adolfo Urso
Fabio Gava
Valentino Valentini
Maurizio Paniz
Catia Polidori

Democratic Party
Andrea Martella
Pier Paolo Baretta
Simonetta Rubinato
Rodolfo Viola
Delia Murer
Francesco Tempestini

Union of the Centre
Luisa Capitanio Santolini

Italy of Values
Massimo Donadi

Senate

The People of Freedom

Giancarlo Galan (replaced by Piero Longo on 29 April 2008)
Luigi Ramponi
Maria Elisabetta Alberti Casellati
Maurizio Sacconi
Maurizio Saia
Paolo Scarpa Bonazza Buora
Anna Bonfrisco
Maurizio Castro

Lega Nord

Federico Bricolo
Piergiorgio Stiffoni
Paolo Franco
Alberto Filippi
Gianvittore Vaccari
Gianpaolo Vallardi
Luciano Cagnin

Democratic Party

Enrico Morando
Maria Pia Garavaglia
Paolo Giaretta
Felice Casson
Paolo Nerozzi
Maurizio Fistarol
Franca Donaggio
Marco Stradiotto

Italy of Values

Elio Lanutti

Elections in Veneto
General, Veneto